Waldeck Pumped Storage Station (in German: Pumpspeicherkraftwerk Waldeck) is one of the largest pumped storage power stations in Germany. It is located in the Waldeck-Frankenberg district in the municipality Edertal near the town Waldeck in the northern part of the state Hesse and is owned by German electric utility E.ON.

The power station consists of two parts with a common lower reservoir (Affoldener See).

Waldeck I 

Waldeck I was commissioned in 1931 and has currently an installed capacity of 143 MW. Water is stored in the Waldeck I Upper Reservoir which has a volume of 0.7 mn m³.

Waldeck II 

Waldeck II was commissioned in 1974 and has currently an installed capacity of 480 MW. Water is stored in the Waldeck II Upper Reservoir which has a volume of 4.4 mn m³.  Waldeck II is built as an underground power station, its machinery is located in a large cavern.

It was planned to extend Waldeck II with an additional turbine of 300 MW. This project is postponed at some indefinite future date because (according to E.ON) new pumped storage stations are not profitable in Germany.

Electrical substation 

Waldeck I and II have a common electrical substation. Waldeck I is connected to the 110 kV electrical grid of Avacon. Waldeck II is connected to the 380 kV electrical grid of TenneT TSO.

Peterskopfbahn 

A funicular called Peterskopfbahn runs in parallel to the penstocks between the upper reservoir and power house of Waldeck I. The funicular is publicly accessible between Easter and October.

References

External links 

 E.ON: Graphic presentation of the power plant assemblies at the Waldeck site

Pumped-storage hydroelectric power stations in Germany
Buildings and structures in Waldeck-Frankenberg
Underground power stations
Energy infrastructure completed in 1931
Energy infrastructure completed in 1974
Reservoirs in Hesse